The Trevithick Society is a registered charity named for Richard Trevithick, a Cornish engineer who contributed to the use of high pressure steam engines for transportation and mining applications.

History
In 1935 the Cornish Engines Preservation Committee (CEPC) was formed to rescue the Levant winding engine which was deemed outdated and scheduled to be scrapped. CEPC were forerunners in the field of Industrial Archaeology. They acquired another winding engine and two pumping engines. CEPC merged with the newly formed Cornish Waterwheel Preservation Society in 1971 and named the organisation the Trevithick Society after Richard Trevithick.

Chapel Coombe
At Chapel Coombe a set of old Cornish stamps has been re-erected by the Trevithick Society.

Dolcoath pumping engine
The pumping engine that worked this shaft dated from 1815; a piece of the cast iron bob from this engine is preserved in the collection of the Trevithick Society.

Membership
Although founded in Cornwall, members are located across England and the world. An annual celebration is held to celebrate Richard Trevithick's life in Cornwall at Camborne.

Membership is offered to students, individuals and corporations domestically and internationally. Members receive the quarterly newsletter. All members, except students who receive a discounted membership fee, receive the annual journal. Members may attend Cornish Engines (free), Geevor Tin Mine (free), lectures, activities and the Society's annual meeting.

Journal of the Trevithick Society
The organisation produces the Journal of the Trevithick Society annually and a newsletter quarterly. The purpose of the journal is: "For the study of history of industry and technology in Cornwall."

Publications
 Climax Rock Drill Company, Trevithick Society. Climax Illustrated. Trevithick Society; 2006. .
 John Corin. Levant: A Champion Cornish Mine. Trevithick Society; 1992. .
 Richard John Cunnack; Justin Brooke; Trevithick Society. The Cunnack Manuscript: from notes taken between 1845 and 1907. Trevithick Society; October 1993. .
 Bryan Earl. Cornish Explosives: A History from 1900 to 1976. Trevithick Society; 2006. .
 Thomas Roberts Harris. Sir Goldsworthy Gurney, 1793–1875. Trevithick Society : Federation of Old Cornwall Societies; 1975. .
 Peter Joseph. Hard Graft: Botallack Mine in the Twentieth Century. Trevithick Society; 2010. .
 Peter Joseph. Mining Accidents in the St Just District, 1831–1914. Trevithick Society; 1 January 1999. .
 Frank Michell; Trevithick Society. Michell: A Family of Cornish Engineers 1740–1910. Trevithick Society; June 1984
 L. P. S. Piper. A short history of the Camborne School of Mines. Trevithick Society; 1975
 Nigel Tangye; Trevithick Society; Institute of Cornish Studies. Cornwall newspapers, 18th & 19th century: gazetteer & finding list. Trevithick Society; 1 December 1980
 Trevithick Society. Cornish Pumping Engines. Trevithick Society; 1985. .
 Trevithick Society. Cornish Pumping Engines and Rotative Beam Engines: Containing a Reprint of a Book Published in 1953 by the Cornish Engines Preservation Society. Trevithick Society; 1998. .
 John Hubert Trounson. Cornish Engines & the Men who Handled Them. Trevithick Society; 1 January 1985. .
 J. H. Trounson; Trevithick Society. Mining in Cornwall 1850–1960. Dyllansow Truran; 1989. .

Gallery

See also

 Association for Industrial Archaeology
 IA, The Journal of the Society for Industrial Archeology
 Lean's Engine Reporter

References

Further reading
 Barry Gamble. Cornish Mines: St Just to Redruth. Alison Hodge Publishers; April 2011. .
 James Hodge. Richard Trevithick. Osprey Publishing; 4 March 2008. .
 Catherine Mills. Regulating Health and Safety in the British Mining Industries, 1800–1914. Ashgate Publishing, Ltd.; 28 February 2010. .
 Thomas Spargo. Statistics and Observations on the Mines of Cornwall and Devon.. Darling and Son, Printers; 1860.

External links
 Official site: Trevithick Society
 Former Trevithick Society website

Industrial archaeology
Archaeological organizations
Cornish mining organisations
Charities based in Cornwall
Society